Danis dissimilis is a butterfly in the family Lycaenidae. It was described by James John Joicey and George Talbot in 1916. It is endemic to the Schouten Islands in the Australasian realm.

References

External links
Danis at Markku Savela's Lepidoptera and Some Other Life Forms

Danis (butterfly)
Butterflies described in 1916
Taxa named by James John Joicey
Taxa named by George Talbot (entomologist)